South Carolina Highway 181 (SC 181) is a  state highway in the U.S. state of South Carolina. The highway connects the Georgia state line with Starr.

Route description
SC 181 begins at the Georgia state line at a point southwest of Starr, within Anderson County, where the roadway crosses over the Savannah River and continues as Georgia State Route 181 (Smith–McGee Highway). It travels to the northeast and has a brief concurrency with SC 187. The highway continues to the northeast and enters Starr. There, it meets its northern terminus, an intersection with SC 412 (Rainey Road/Stones Throw Avenue). Here, the roadway continues as Smith–McGee Road.

History

Major intersections

See also

References

External links
 
SC 181 at Virginia Highways' South Carolina Highways Annex

181
Transportation in Anderson County, South Carolina